Palmar branch may refer to:
 Palmar branch of the median nerve
 Palmar branch of ulnar nerve